John Farr may refer to:
 John Farr (British politician) (1922–1997), Conservative Party politician
 John R. Farr (1857–1933), Pennsylvania congressman
 John Farr, nom-de-plume of the novelist Jack Webb

See also
 John N. Pharr (1829–1903), Louisiana businessperson and politician